Aigueperse (Auvergnat: Guiparsa) is a commune in the Puy-de-Dôme department in Auvergne-Rhône-Alpes in central France.

Population

Personalities
Aigueperse was the birthplace of:
 Michel de l'Hôpital (c. 1505–1573), statesman
 Jacques Delille (1738–1813), poet, said to be a descendant of the former

See also
Communes of the Puy-de-Dôme department

References

External links

 Official website
 aigueperse.net (in French)

Communes of Puy-de-Dôme
Bourbonnais